The 1976 U.S. Pro Indoor was a men's tennis tournament played on indoor carpet courts that was part of the WCT circuit. It was the 9th edition of the tournament and was played at the Spectrum in Philadelphia, Pennsylvania in the United States from January 26 through February 1, 1976. First-seeded Jimmy Connors won the singles title.

Finals

Singles

 Jimmy Connors defeated  Björn Borg 7–6(7–5), 6–4, 6–0 
 It was Connors' 2nd singles title of the year and the 43rd of his career.

Doubles

 Rod Laver /  Dennis Ralston defeated  Bob Hewitt /  Frew McMillan 7–6(8–6), 7–6(7–3) 
 It was Laver's 1st title of the year and the 66th of his career. It was Ralston's only title of the year and the 3rd of his career.

References

External links
 ITF tournament edition details

U.S. Pro Indoor
U.S. Pro Indoor
U.S. Professional Indoor
U.S. Professional Indoor
U.S. Professional Indoor
U.S. Professional Indoor